Half Ours (foaled March 27, 2003 in Kentucky) is a Thoroughbred race horse. A striking grey roan like his sire, he is a son of Unbridled's Song out of the winning mare Zing by Storm Cat. Zing is a full sister to stakes winner Yankee Gentleman.  Grade 1 winner Key Phrase is the second dam of Half Ours.

After a workout on June 21, 2007 at Belmont Park, Half Ours suffered a fracture to a hind cannon bone and had surgery to insert two screws in the leg. 

Beginning in 2008, Half Ours stood at Taylor Made farm as a stallion. In 2010 he was transferred to Clear Creek Stud, Folsom, Louisiana.

Connections 
Half Ours, originally owned by Aaron and Marie Jones in partnership with Barry K. Schwartz, was sold in November 2006 for a record 6.1 million dollars at Keeneland November breeding stock sale.  In a dissolution of the partnership, Aaron Jones outbid Schwartz for the colt.

Laid off for nineteen months due a fractured ankle incurred in the Three Chimney's Juvenile, Half Ours returned to the races in December 2006.

Trained by Todd Pletcher, in his seven lifetime starts Half Ours was ridden by John Velazquez.

Races 
 7th, Metropolitan Handicap - G1, May 28, 2007
 2nd, The Alysheba Stakes - G3, May 4, 2007
 1st, Richter Scale Breeders' Cup Sprint Championship Handicap - G2, March 3, 2007
 1st, Optional Claiming, Gulfstream Park, February 4, 2007
 1st, Optional Claiming, Aqueduct Race Track, December 14, 2006
 1st, Three Chimneys Juvenile, Churchill Downs, May 7, 2005, by over four lengths.
 1st, Maiden, Keeneland Race Course, April 17, 2005.

References 
 Half Ours pedigree and photo

2003 racehorse births
Thoroughbred family 19
Racehorses bred in Kentucky
Racehorses trained in the United States